Surendra Maithani is an Indian politician and is a member of Uttar Pradesh Legislative Assembly from Govind Nagar assembly constituency of Kanpur Nagar district.

References

Living people
Year of birth missing (living people)
Uttar Pradesh MLAs 2022–2027
Bharatiya Janata Party politicians from Uttar Pradesh